Gateworld: The Home Planet is a platform game developed and published by Homebrew Software and released in 1993. This game was Homebrew Software's first software product. There are three episodes of 12 levels each, the first available as shareware.

Plot
The space explorer Captain Buzz Klondike travels in his artificially intelligent ship Stella, who stumbles on an asteroid with some valuable mineral deposits. But as Klondike ventures deeper into the asteroid, he realises the asteroid was sent from the planet of Gateworld, where trouble runs amok.

Gameplay
Each episode is divided into three acts. Each act has three normal levels and a boss level. The player's goal is to get Klondike through the levels, by finding the gate teleporter key and accessing the gate teleporter to proceed. Bosses in boss levels are indestructible, so the player must avoid them. To finish the final boss level of an episode, the player must destroy the base machine to get the final gate teleporter key.

Klondike is able to fire his weapon straight or diagonally up or down. Some enemies are harmless, but obstructive while others cause Klondike damage on impact or with projectiles. Traps are also present throughout the levels. Canisters can be picked up for health, stars can be picked up for powerups (or the occasional harmful stars) and guns can be picked up for ammunition.

Development
The game was under development by Apogee Software in 1991. However, the quality of the game was deemed poor and the project was cancelled in 1992, then replaced with Major Stryker. Homebrew Software took over where the game left off. Homebrew planned to port the game to Windows by 2001, but the port was never released.

References

External links

Homebrew Software Official Website

1993 video games
Cancelled Windows games
DOS games
DOS-only games
Platform games
Science fiction video games
Side-scrolling platform games
Video games developed in the United States